Johann Stridbeck the Younger (1665, Augsburg - 19 December 1714, Augsburg) was a German draughtsman, engraver and publisher. He trained under his father, the engraver and publisher Johann Stridbeck the Elder (died 1716).

External links
https://portal.dnb.de/opac.htm?method=simpleSearch&query=118619292
https://www.deutsche-digitale-bibliothek.de/entity/118619292
http://gso.gbv.de/DB=1.28/REL?PPN=005013976&RELTYPE=TT

1665 births
1714 deaths
German publishers (people)
Engravers from Augsburg
German draughtsmen